Zolotukha is a rural locality (a selo) in Zolotukhinsky Selsoviet of Akhtubinsky District, Astrakhan Oblast, Russia. The population was 1,462 as of 2010. There are 22 streets.

Geography 
Zolotukha is located 77 km southeast of Akhtubinsk (the district's administrative centre) by road. Udachnoye is the nearest rural locality.

References 

Rural localities in Akhtubinsky District